Barnside is a hamlet on Barnside Lane approximately 3/4 mile to the southeast of Hepworth in West Yorkshire, England.  It is in the civic parish of Holme Valley and the metropolitan borough of Kirklees.

History
In 1822 Thomas Langdale recorded that Barnside-Wood in the township of Hepworth comprised four farm houses.

Barnside Colliery, approximately 1/2 mile from the current hamlet operated from –.

References

External links

 Barnside Colliery – Hepworth, West Yorkshire

Hamlets in West Yorkshire
Holme Valley
Towns and villages of the Peak District